Lachnoderma is a genus of beetles in the family Carabidae, containing the following species:

 Lachnoderma asperum (Bates, 1883)
 Lachnoderma biguttatum (Bates, 1892)
 Lachnoderma chebaling (Tian & Deuve, 2001)
 Lachnoderma cheni (Tian & Deuve, 2001)
 Lachnoderma cinctum (W.J.Macleay, 1873)
 Lachnoderma confusum (Tian & Deuve, 2001)
 Lachnoderma foveolatum (Sloane, 1915)
 Lachnoderma hirsutum (Bates, 1873) 
 Lachnoderma kathmanduense (Kirschenhofer, 1994)
 Lachnoderma maindroni (Tian & Deuve, 2001)
 Lachnoderma metallicum (Tian & Deuve, 2001)
 Lachnoderma nideki (Louwerens, 1952)
 Lachnoderma philippinense (Jedlicka, 1934)
 Lachnoderma polybothris (Louwerens, 1967)
 Lachnoderma tricolor (Andrewes, 1926)
 Lachnoderma vietnamense (Kirschenhofer, 1996)
 Lachnoderma yingdeicum (Tian & Deuve, 2001)

References

Lebiinae